ACE Aviation Holdings Inc. is a Canadian holding company that is the former parent company of Air Canada. It is headquartered in Montreal. In 2012, the company signified its intent to dissolve, but is still undergoing liquidation as of 2020.

History
ACE Aviation Holdings was created as Air Canada emerged from bankruptcy in 2004; By the end of 2005, ACE completed restructuring and achieved reduced costs through outsourcing, automation and process simplification. One of the more significant changes was the merging of its six small airlines into Air Canada and Air Canada Jazz. ACE was not only a solution to Air Canada's bankruptcy, but also a strategic move by Robert Milton to create a portfolio of independent air transportation services companies out of what was Air Canada.

Among the companies in addition to Air Canada which was taken public after formation of ACE was the frequent flyer program Aeroplan.

In 2005, ACE contributed  in equity investment to the merger of America West Holdings and US Airways Group, which resulted in US Airways emerging from its second bankruptcy.

In 2008, ACE completed its divestment of Aeroplan and Air Canada's regional airline affiliate, Jazz. After these divestments, ACE retained a 75% stake in Air Canada and a 23% stake in Air Canada Technical Services.

On May 9, 2012, the company received a certificate of intent to dissolve, marking the end of any future activities by the company.

The company planned a wind up and distribution of its assets back to its shareholders by no earlier than mid-2013. While all of the core aviation assets have been disposed of, the corporate website continues to operate until all assets are fully disposed of. The company no longer has a board and executives, with all liquidation being managed by outside party Ernst & Young.

Former operating divisions
Aeroplan – former in-house rewards program sold off and was owned by Aimia, later acquired by Air Canada.
Air Canada – airline sold off 
Air Canada Cargo – transferred to control under Air Canada
Air Canada Ground Handling Services – transferred to Air Canada
Jazz Aviation LP – sold off and now owned by Chorus Aviation and operates as contractor for Air Canada
Aveos Fleet Performance Inc. - formerly as Air Canada Technical Services before being renamed in 2008, acquired Air Canada Mechanics in 2011 and ceased operations in 2012 with remaining assets (equipment and Montreal facility) now acquired by Lockheed Martin Canada and AJW Technique.
Air Canada Vacations – transferred to Air Canada

References

Sources

Notes 

Companies formerly listed on the Toronto Stock Exchange
Companies listed on the NEX Exchange
Air Canada
Companies based in Montreal
Canadian companies established in 2004
Airline holding companies of Canada
Holding companies established in 2004